Sasaoka may refer to
Shigezō Sasaoka (1948–1998), Japanese voice actor 
Shinji Sasaoka (born 1967), Japanese baseball pitcher 
Mishō-ryū Sasaoka, Japanese school of ikebana